Queen Beatrice may refer to:

Queen consorts 
Beatrice of Bavaria (1344–1359), Queen consort of Eric XII of Sweden
Beatrice of Bourbon, Queen of Bohemia, (1320–1383), Queen consort of Bohemia by marriage to John of Bohemia
Beatrice of Castile (1242–1303), second Queen consort of Afonso III of Portugal
Beatrice of Castile (1293–1359), Queen consort of Afonso IV of Portugal
Beatrice d'Este, Queen of Hungary  (1215 – before 1245), Queen consort of Hungary as the third wife of King Andrew II of Hungary
Beatrice of Luxembourg (1305–1319), Queen consort of Charles I of Hungary
Beatrice of Naples (1457–1508), also known as Beatrice of Aragon, twice Queen consort of Hungary and of Bohemia, having married both Matthias Corvinus and Vladislaus II
Beatrice of Portugal (1373 – c. 1420), Queen consort of John I of Castile
Beatrice of Provence (c. 1229 – 1267), ruling Countess of Provence and Forcalquier from 1245 until her death, and Countess of Anjou and Maine, Queen consort of Sicily and Naples by marriage to Charles I of Naples
Beatrice of Rethel (c. 1132 – 1185), third Queen consort of the King Roger II of Sicily
Beatrice of Swabia (1198–1212), Holy Roman Empress and German Queen as the first wife of Otto IV
Elisabeth of Swabia (1205–1235), renamed Beatrice, Queen consort of Castile and León by marriage to Ferdinand III of Castile

See also
 Beatrice
 Beatrix